The 2019–20 Buildbase FA Vase was the 46th season of the FA Vase, an annual football competition for teams playing below Step 4 of the English National League System. The competition was played with two qualifying rounds preceding the six proper rounds, semi-finals (played over two legs) and final to be played at Wembley Stadium. All first-leg ties until the semi-finals were played with extra time if level after 90 minutes – first-leg ties may also be resolved with penalties if both teams agree and notify the referee at least 45 minutes before kick-off, per rule 11a of the Rules of the Challenge Vase.

The competition was paused at the semi-final stage due to the COVID-19 pandemic in the United Kingdom. The competition resumed in September 2020, but following new restrictions on gatherings in England the final was further postponed eventually being played on 3 May 2021.

Calendar
The calendar for the 2019–20 Buildbase FA Vase, as announced by The Football Association.

First round qualifying

Second Round Qualifying

First round proper

Second round proper

Third round proper

Fourth round proper

Fifth Round Proper

Quarter-finals

Semi-finals
Originally scheduled for March 2020, the two-legged semi-finals were postponed due to the COVID-19 pandemic. The FA declared their intention to complete the tournament, but with an uncertain timeframe. In late August 2020, they scheduled the semi-finals as single matches in September, with a date of 27 September for the final at Wembley. The final, alongside the FA Trophy final held as part of the same event, was to be among the matches trialling the return of spectators to elite football after the height of the first wave of the pandemic in the UK, but this was further postponed following new restrictions on gatherings in England that were enacted on 14 September 2020 as COVID-19 cases increased.

Final
The final was finally scheduled to be played behind closed doors on 3 May 2021, after the date of 27 September 2020 was abandoned with the hope of allowing fans into the stadium.

References

FA Vase seasons
FA Vase
2019–20 in English football
FA Vase